Sagenodus is an extinct genus of prehistoric lungfish. It is a lungfish from the Permo-Carboniferous period found in Europe and North America.

See also

 Sarcopterygii
 List of sarcopterygians
 List of prehistoric bony fish

References

Prehistoric lobe-finned fish genera
Permian bony fish
Prehistoric fish of North America